The 2021–22 Scottish League Cup (also known as the Premier Sports Cup for sponsorship reasons) was the 76th season of Scotland's second-most prestigious football knockout competition.

The format for the 2021–22 competition was similar to the previous five seasons. It began with eight groups of five teams including all 2020–21 Scottish Professional Football League (SPFL) clubs, excluding those competing in Champions League, Europa League and Europa Conference League qualifiers, as well as the winners of the 2020–21 Highland Football League (Brora Rangers) and the 2020–21 Lowland Football League (Kelty Hearts).

A difference from recent seasons was that five clubs were given a bye to the last 16 instead of four, due to increased representation in European competition. This meant that another non-league club (East Kilbride) were invited to round out the group stage.

The domestic broadcasting rights for the competition are held exclusively by Premier Sports, who became the tournament's title sponsor in April 2021.

St Johnstone were the defending champions after beating Livingston 1–0 in the last season's final. They were eliminated in the semi-finals by eventual winners Celtic, who won their 20th title after beating Hibernian 2–1 in the final.

Schedule

Format
The competition began with eight groups of five teams. The five clubs competing in the UEFA Champions League (Rangers and Celtic), Europa League (St Johnstone) and Conference League (Hibernian and Aberdeen) qualifying rounds were given a bye through to the second round. The 40 teams competing in the group stage consisted of the other seven teams that competed in the 2020–21 Scottish Premiership, and all of the teams that competed in the 2020–21 Scottish Championship, 2020–21 Scottish League One and 2020–21 Scottish League Two. The 2020–21 Highland Football League and the 2020–21 Lowland Football League champions also competed. Due to a fifth Scottish team participating in European competition and receiving a bye to the second round, an extra spot was available in the group stage. This was taken by Lowland League side East Kilbride, after lots were drawn between the Lowland League and Highland League runners-up for the final place in the groups. 

The winners of each of the eight groups, as well as the three best runners-up progressed to the second round (last 16), which included the five UEFA qualifying clubs. At this stage, the competition reverted to the traditional knock-out format. The three group winners with the highest points total and the clubs entering at this stage were seeded, with the five group winners with the lowest points unseeded along with the three best runners-up.

Bonus point system
In December 2015, the SPFL announced that alongside the new group stage format, a bonus point system would be introduced to provide greater excitement and increase the number of meaningful games at this stage. The traditional point system of awarding three points for a win and one point for a draw is used, however, for each group stage match that finishes in a draw, a penalty shoot-out takes place, with the winner being awarded a bonus point.

Group stage

The group stage was made up of seven teams from the 2020–21 Scottish Premiership, and all ten teams from each of the 2020–21 Scottish Championship, 2020–21 Scottish League One and 2020–21 Scottish League Two, as well as the winners and runners-up of the 2020–21 Lowland Football League and the winners of the 2020–21 Highland Football League. The 40 teams were divided into two sections – North and South – with each section containing four top seeds, four second seeds and 12 unseeded teams. Each section was drawn into four groups with each group comprising one top seed, one second seed and three unseeded teams.

The draw for the group stage took place on 28 May 2021 and was broadcast live on FreeSports & the SPFL YouTube channel.

North

Group A

Group B

Group C

Group D

South

Group E

Group F

Group G

Group H

Best runners-up

Knockout phase

Second round

Draw and seeding
Aberdeen, Celtic, Hibernian, Rangers and St Johnstone entered the competition at this stage, after receiving a bye for the group stage due to their participation in UEFA club competitions.

The five UEFA-qualifying clubs and the three group winners with the best record were seeded for the draw.

The draw for the second round took place on 25 July 2021.

Teams in Bold advanced to the quarter-finals.

Notes
† denotes teams playing in the Championship.

Matches

Quarter-finals

Draw

Teams in Bold advanced to the semi-finals.

Matches

Semi-finals

Draw
The draw for the semi-finals took place on 23 September 2021 live on Premier Sports following the Celtic v Raith Rovers match.

Matches

Final

Media coverage
The domestic broadcasting rights for the competition are held exclusively by Premier Sports who will broadcast between 12 and 16 Premier Sports Cup live matches per season as well as highlights.

The following matches were broadcast live on UK television:

Notes

Top goalscorers

Source:

References

Scottish League Cup seasons
League Cup
League Cup